Walter Kempton Cannon (1879–1994), usually known as Kempton, was a Classic-winning British jockey. He was the third son of the three-times Champion Jockey, Tom Cannon, Sr., while his brothers were another champion, Morny Cannon, Tom Cannon, Jr. and Charles Cannon. He was named after Kempton Park Racecourse.

He rode his first winner at fourteen and went on to win the 1901 St. Leger on Doricles and the 1904 Derby on St. Amant by three lengths for Leopold de Rothschild.

He quit riding shortly before World War I (during which he served in the Royal Flying Corps) and ran a garage in Newmarket. He ultimately retired to Hove on the south coast.  He was married to the widow of another jockey, Jack Watts.

References

Bibliography

See also
List of significant families in British horse racing

English jockeys
1879 births
1951 deaths